Thomas Brent "Boo" Weekley (born July 23, 1973) is an American professional golfer who plays on the PGA Tour.

Overview
Born in Milton, Florida, Weekley turned professional in 1997 and played on mini-tours until 2002, when he qualified for the PGA Tour.  He made the cut in only five of 24 events that year, and lost his tour card. From 2003 through 2006, he played on the Nationwide Tour, finishing well enough in 2006 to again qualify for the PGA Tour. His first victory came at the Verizon Heritage in April 2007.

Weekley's good form at the start of the 2007 season included two top 10 finishes before his victory, after which he reached a new career high of 55 in the Official World Golf Rankings. Later in 2007, he entered the top 50 of the rankings. He represented the United States at the 2007 Omega Mission Hills World Cup with Heath Slocum and finished in 2nd place.

In 2008, Weekley successfully defended his title at the Verizon Heritage, and rose into the top 25 of the rankings. Weekley shot to prominence at the 2008 Ryder Cup, with a succession of virtuoso displays of superb golf including an emphatic 4&2 victory over Oliver Wilson in final day Singles play. The final day was also notable however when Weekley was filmed riding his driver "cowboy horse" style down the first fairway.

Weekley's nickname comes from Yogi Bear's sidekick, Boo Boo Bear.

He attended Abraham Baldwin Agricultural College where he studied turfgrass science. After only one year at Baldwin, where he played on the golf team, Weekley returned home. He was hired as a hydroblaster at the Monsanto chemical plant in Pensacola, Fla. where he would be lowered into large ammonia tanks to clean them.

Weekley began his professional career on the Developmental Players Tour (DP Tour) in Atlanta, Ga., a tour co-founded by Jack Slocum, father of fellow PGA golfer and friend Heath Slocum. Weekley attended high school with Slocum and they played together on the golf team. He lists Ben Hogan as his hero. In May 2013, Weekley won the Crowne Plaza Invitational at Colonial in Fort Worth, Texas. Weekley beat Matt Kuchar by one stroke to take his first win in five years.

Since 2017, injuries have been significantly limiting Weekley's schedule. He played no professional golf events between the July 2017 RBC Canadian Open on the PGA Tour and the January 2019 Bahamas Great Exuma Classic on the Web.com Tour, suffering from tendinitis. Again, Weekley played no events between the November 2019 RSM Classic on the PGA Tour and the June 2022 Rex Hospital Open on the Korn Ferry Tour. Weekley no longer has full-time status on the PGA Tour, but continues to make limited starts using past champions status and sponsor exemptions.

Professional wins (3)

PGA Tour wins (3)

PGA Tour playoff record (0–1)

Playoff record
Nationwide Tour playoff record (0–1)

Other playoff record (0–1)

Results in major championships

CUT = missed the half-way cut
WD = withdrew
"T" indicates a tie for a place

Summary

Most consecutive cuts made – 5 (2007 U.S. Open – 2008 U.S. Open)
Longest streak of top-10s – 1

Results in The Players Championship

CUT = missed the halfway cut
WD = withdrew
"T" indicates a tie for a place

Results in World Golf Championships

QF, R16, R32, R64 = Round in which player lost in match play
"T" = Tied
Note that the HSBC Champions did not become a WGC event until 2009.

U.S. national team appearances
World Cup: 2007
Ryder Cup: 2008 (winner)
Wendy's 3-Tour Challenge (representing PGA Tour): 2010 (winners), 2011, 2013

See also
2001 PGA Tour Qualifying School graduates
2006 Nationwide Tour graduates

References

External links

Pensacola News Journal: Trio of Milton High Grads Bound for Masters

American male golfers
PGA Tour golfers
European Tour golfers
Ryder Cup competitors for the United States
Korn Ferry Tour graduates
Golfers from Florida
People from Milton, Florida
Milton High School (Florida) alumni
1973 births
Living people